Ruben John Efford  (January 6, 1944 – January 2, 2022) was a Canadian politician. He first served as a member of the Newfoundland and Labrador House of Assembly (MHA) from 1985 to 2001, representing Port de Grave electoral district and also serving as cabinet minister of various portfolios.  After losing the 2001 leadership convention of the Liberal Party of Newfoundland and Labrador, he went into federal politics and served as a Member of Parliament (MP) from 2002 until 2006 for the Liberal Party of Canada.  He initially represented Bonavista—Trinity—Conception, before switching to Avalon after electoral redistribution prior to the 2004 federal election.

Early life
Ruben John Efford was born on January 6, 1944, in Port de Grave, Newfoundland and Labrador, the son of Reuben John and Diana Efford.  He completed high school in his hometown, before doing a business administration program.  He went on to become the owner and operator of Efford’s Wholesale, Snow's Plumbing Ltd and the Della Lee retail clothing store.  He joined and actively participated in the Liberal Party of Newfoundland and Labrador during the early 1960s.  He was elected to the District Liberal Association in 1969 and eventually became its vice-president.

Provincial politics
Efford entered provincial politics in 1985, running in the election that year for the provincial Liberals.  He was elected to the House of Assembly, representing the riding of Port de Grave.  He was initially Opposition critic for consumer affairs, public works, fisheries, health and social services.  He later served as minister of social services, minister of works, services and transportation, and minister of fisheries and aquaculture after the Liberals won the 1989 provincial election.

A founding member and chairperson of the United Fisherpersons of Newfoundland and Labrador, Efford opposed the federal cod moratorium that impacted the province's economy.  He accompanied Newfoundlander fish harvesters to Nathan Phillips Square in Toronto to protest the measure and argued for their rights to fish.  In his capacity as fisheries minister from 1996 to 2000, Efford was a strong proponent of seal hunting, which was given conditional support from the federal government's fishery advisory committee – consisting of representatives from the industry and academia – as well as the House of Commons' fisheries committee.  He was perturbed by some students and scientists at Memorial University of Newfoundland who wrote to the federal fisheries minister requesting that the latter delay increasing the seal quota until a complete scientific review was conducted.  Efford was of the opinion that they were undermining his efforts.

Efford ultimately served as a MHA from 1985 to 2001.  He lost the 2001 leadership convention to become Liberal party leader to Roger Grimes by 14 votes in a divisive contest.  Despite Grimes offering him a senior cabinet position, both Efford and fellow leadership contestant Paul Dicks subsequently left provincial politics, maintaining that they could not work with Grimes.

Federal politics
Efford was elected to the House of Commons in a by-election in May 2002 and was re-elected in the 2004 general election.  He was appointed Minister of Natural Resources in December 2003 and served in that role until February 2006.  During his tenure, the federal government came to a new agreement on the Atlantic Accord with the provincial government of Newfoundland and Labrador.  He also served as a member of the standing committees on Canadian Heritage, Fisheries and Oceans, on the standing committees of Human Resources Development, Status of Persons with Disabilities, Aboriginal Affairs, and Northern Development and Natural Resources.

Retirement
After considerable speculation that he intended to resign his federal cabinet position due to ill-health, Efford announced on September 1, 2005, to much surprise, that he had no intention to resign.  He later stated on NTV that he would not run again in the 2006 federal election or run for the leadership of the Newfoundland Liberal Party. In November 2005, it was reported that Efford was retiring from politics due to poor health from diabetes.

In February 2011, Efford criticized the leadership of provincial Liberal Leader Yvonne Jones and called for her to consider resigning. Efford stated that her low poll numbers were the main reason for his request. He referenced a Telelink poll released that week by NTV, in which 11 percent of respondents said they would prefer Jones to lead the province. Jones responded by saying Efford was an absolute nuisance to the Newfoundland and Labrador Liberal party, and another poll done in March showed that Jones' popularity was now up to 18% from the 11% that the February poll showed.

Personal life
Efford was married to Madonna until his death.  Together, they had three children: Jacqueline Ann, John III and Joseph Lee.

Efford revealed in 2019 that he had been battling Alzheimer's disease for two years.  He died on January 2, 2022, at a hospital in Carbonear, four days shy of his 78th birthday.

Electoral history 

Source:

|-

|-

|-
 
|NDP
|Steve Quigley
|align="right"|185
|align="right"|
|align="right"|
|}

References

External links
 
How'd They Vote?: John Efford's voting history and quotes

1944 births
2022 deaths
20th-century Canadian politicians
Liberal Party of Canada MPs
Liberal Party of Newfoundland and Labrador MHAs
Members of the Executive Council of Newfoundland and Labrador
Members of the House of Commons of Canada from Newfoundland and Labrador
Members of the King's Privy Council for Canada
Mining ministers of Canada
Members of the 27th Canadian Ministry